AEDC Aerodynamic and Propulsion Test Unit (APTU) is a blowdown hypersonic wind tunnel driven by a combustion air heater (CAH).  The facility is owned by the United States Air Force and operated by Aerospace Testing Alliance.

History 
The AEDC Aerodynamic and Propulsion Test Unit started out as a vitiated air heater (VAH) conducting over 275 experiments for the development of many different aerodynamic and aerothermal systems.  Upgrades to the facility started in 2002 in order to provide ground-test capability for supersonic and hypersonic systems up to flight speeds of Mach 8.

Capabilities
The facility was designed to provide ground-based simulations of supersonic and hypersonic flight conditions.  The combustion air heater can provide total pressures from 200 psia to 2,800 psia (13.6 atm to 190.5 atm) and a  total temperatures from 1,200°R to 4,700°R (667 K to 2,611 K). Five nozzles ranging from  Mach 3.2 to Mach 7.1 are currently available.

See also 
 Arnold Air Force Base
 Supersonic wind tunnel
 Scramjet

References

External links
 Arnold Engineering Development Center (official)

Wind tunnels